Filatima rhypodes is a moth of the family Gelechiidae. It is found in Mexico (Sonora).

The wingspan is about 14 mm. The forewings are stone-white, sparsely sprinkled beyond the basal fourth with groups of blackish scales, among which a discal spot before the middle, a spot at the end of the cell and another in the fold, slightly preceding the first, are scarcely more conspicuous than the smaller groups and scattered scales which occur towards the tornus and along the termen, spreading slightly into the cilia. The hindwings are whitish grey, slightly darkening toward the apex.

References

Moths described in 1911
Filatima